Marinus Franciscus Johannes "Marijn" Backer (born 6 September 1956) is a Dutch educator, poet, and writer.

Backer has been publishing poetry, including in translation, at least since 1986. In 1992 he won the Zilveren Griffel prize with Inez van Eijk for his first children's book Lieve engerd, de groeten. Backer has been publishing youth literature ever since and occasionally engages in nonfiction. His poems are still published on his website. Two of Backer's books have been published in German translation. His poems were published in 18 languages.

Backer is a dean and a teacher of Greek and Latin at the Werkplaats Kindergemeenschap. He is an author of the teaching method Fortuna for Latin. In the 2000s, he wrote a biweekly column on education for NRC Handelsblad.

Books

Youth literature
 1992 – Lieve engerd, de groetjes [Contact], co-author: Inez van Eijk
 1995 – Thuis niet thuis [Piramide]
 1996 – Ik hou waar ik van hou [Piramide]
 1998 – Dossier Wauter Both [Piramide]
 2003 – Schrijf me! [De Fontein], co-author: Inez van Eijk, updated version of Lieve engerd, de groeten
 2006 – Kijk niet om [Leopold]
 2008 – Ik ben van niemand [Leopold]
 2009 – Het geheim van de verdwenen dieren [Leopold]
 2010 – Het jaar van de leugen [Leopold], published in German as Das Jahr der Lügen (2014, Urachhaus)
 2012 – Watermeisje [Leopold]
 2016 – Toen de vogels kwamen [Leopold]

Nonfiction 
 2002 – Claus en Manuel [CP Pers], published in German as Claus und Manuel
 2005 – Fortuna Lesboek 1 [Eisma Edumedia]
 2005 – Fortuna Werkboek 1 [Eisma Edumedia]
 2007 – "Het werk van de docent: over nieuw leren, oud leren en begeleiden" in Zijlstra, Henk: Het studiehuis leert, pages 39–44 [Garant]

Poetry 
 1991 – Het oog van de veeboer [Contact]
 1996 – Opdracht [CP Pers]
 2000 – Een takje tussen je tanden [CP Pers]
 2000 – Aan de koolstofconditioner [Wagner & van Santen]

Honors and awards

 1992 – Zilveren Griffel - Lieve engerd, de groetjes
 1995 – Gouden Uil long list - Thuis niet thuis  
 2007 – Gouden Zoen honorary mention - Kijk niet om

References

Dutch writers of young adult literature
Living people
1956 births
Dutch male poets
Writers from Leiden
Dutch columnists
Dutch educators
Dutch education writers
20th-century Dutch poets
21st-century Dutch poets